Manfred L. Keiler (1908-1960) was a German-born American painter, art educator and author. He was a professor of Art at the University of Nebraska–Lincoln from 1950 to 1960. His work can be seen at the Museum of Nebraska Art.

Selected works

References

1908 births
1960 deaths
German emigrants to the United States
University of Nebraska–Lincoln faculty
Painters from Nebraska
American male painters
20th-century American painters
American art educators
American art writers
20th-century American male artists